"Cocaine Decisions"  is a 1983 single by American musician Frank Zappa, from the album The Man from Utopia. A live version was on the album You Can't Do That on Stage Anymore, Vol. 3. It was played in concert from 1981 to 1984.

Meaning
Zappa had many antidrug songs including "Who Needs the Peace Corps?" from We're Only in It for the Money, "Cosmik Debris" from Apostrophe ('), "Charlie's Enormous Mouth" from You Are What You Is, and "I Come From Nowhere" from Ship Arriving Too Late to Save a Drowning Witch. Though unlike the hippies, drug dealers, youth, and junkies the targets of this song are instead the rich Wall Street executives, doctors, and lawyers. Specifically the lyrics "But if you are wasted from the stuff you're stickin' in it. I get madder every day 'cause what you do 'n' what you say affects my life in such a way. I learn to hate it every minute!" are targeted at Zappa's own producers and studio executives. The vocals display a tone of hatred making it one of Zappa's more aggressive songs. In 2000, the CMJ Music Marathon magazine jokingly stated that "Cocaine Decisions" would be a great song to characterize presidential candidate George W. Bush.

Riot
During a concert in Palermo, Italy in 1982, a riot occurred during "Cocaine Decisions" in which the police shot tear gas into the crowd. Zappa was reported stating "We played for an hour and a half  with tear-gas in our face and everything else, and when it was all over we went off stage and we were trapped inside this place". The riot inspired the back cover of the album The Man From Utopia.

Track list
A."Cocaine Decisions" - 2:56 
B."SEX" - 3:00

References

1983 songs
1983 singles
Frank Zappa songs
Songs written by Frank Zappa
Comedy rock songs
Song recordings produced by Frank Zappa
Songs about cocaine
Political songs
Satirical songs